Rodi Ferreira (born 29 May 1998) is a Paraguayan professional footballer who plays as a right back for Confiança

Carreira

Confiança 

No dia 12 de Fevereiro de 2021, Foi anunciado pelo Confiança.

References

External links
 

1998 births
Living people
Association football defenders
Paraguayan footballers
Paraguay under-20 international footballers
Paraguayan Primera División players
Argentine Primera División players
Liga Portugal 2 players
Club Olimpia footballers
Club Atlético Temperley footballers
Leixões S.C. players
Club Atlético 3 de Febrero players
Club Sportivo San Lorenzo footballers
Club Nacional footballers
Paraguayan expatriate footballers
Expatriate footballers in Argentina
Paraguayan expatriate sportspeople in Argentina
Expatriate footballers in Portugal
Paraguayan expatriate sportspeople in Portugal